Red leaf lettuces are a group of lettuce cultivars with red leaves. Red leaf lettuce cultivars include "Lollo Rossa", "New Red Fire Lettuce", "Red Sails Lettuce", "Redina Lettuce", "Henry's Leafy Friend", Galactic Lettuce", and the "Benito Lettuce".

See also

References

Lettuce
Food plant cultivars